The Triversa is a river of Piedmont, Italy. It is a left-side tributary of the Borbore.

Geography 
The Triversa rises from the Bric Ausano between Tonengo and Aramengo (province of Asti).
Flowing southwards through the hills of Monferrato it gets the waters of its two main tributaries, the Traversola from the right side and the rio di Monale from the left.

References

Other projects

Rivers of the Province of Asti
Rivers of Italy